Toshio Fujiwara (藤原 敏男 Fujiwara Toshio, born March 3, 1948) is a Japanese former kickboxer. Out of 141 professional fights before retiring at age 35, Fujiwara won 126, with a remarkable 99 by knockout; most notably, he was the first non-Thai to win a national Muay Thai title belt in Bangkok, a fact that many older Thais still remember and respect about him. Fujiwara became the first ever non-Thai stadium champion in 1978 when he won the lightweight title at Rajadamnern Stadium.

Biography and career
Prior to his kickboxing career, Toshio Fujiwara was mainly engaged in table tennis and maintained great physical fitness. He had no martial arts background before starting Taikiken, a Yiquan derative founded by Kenichi Sawai.

A graduate from the Chuo University, he started training kickboxing at the Mejiro Gym in July 1969, learning under Kenji Kurosaki. He soon won the All Japan Kickboxing Federation championship, and did his first travels to Thailand in 1971. 

In late April of 1972, Fujiwara fought Rungnapa Sitsomsak. The even fight ended in a DQ win for Fujiwara, as Sitsomak's unsportsmanlike conduct got him disqualified on the third round.

In 1975, he had surgery to his left shin which left him hospitalised for 6 weeks. Three days after leaving hospital he ran at a long-distance event.

On March 18, 1978, Fujiwara fought Monsawan Ruk Changmai for the vacant Rajadamnern Championship. The fight ended in controversial fashion, as Fujiwara accidentally headbutted Monsawan unconscious, when both tumbled when locked in a clinch. Regardless, this fight allowed Fujiwara to be the first non-Thai to secure a Rajadamnern championship title win.

Fujiwara retired from fighting in 1983 with a impressive fight record. Subsequently, he founded his own gym, Toshio Fujiwara Sports Gym, which he runs presently in Tokyo. His most famous student in recent years is Satoshi Kobayashi, but many other well-known kickboxers and martial artists have also trained with him, including Masahiro Yamamoto, Satoru Sayama, Sanshu Tsubakichi and Takaaki Nakamura.

In 2010, he was appointed Chairman of Japan Martial arts Directors (JMD), a commissioning group co-operating with the World Professional Muaythai Federation to oversee the development of the sport in Japan.

Fight record

|-  bgcolor="#CCFFCC"
| 1983-02-05 || Win ||align=left| Hideo Adachi ||  || Tokyo, Japan || KO (Punches)|| 3 ||
|-  bgcolor="#CCFFCC"
| 1983-01-07 || Win ||align=left| Dan Masabatsu ||  || Tokyo, Japan || KO || 4 ||
|-  bgcolor="#CCFFCC"
| 1982-11-20 || Win ||align=left| Tsubasa Goro ||  || Tokyo, Japan || KO || 3 ||
|-  bgcolor="#CCFFCC"
| 1982-07-25 || Win ||align=left| Younger Funaki ||  || Tokyo, Japan || KO || 5 ||
|-  bgcolor="#CCFFCC"
| 1982-01-07|| Win ||align=left| Manny Johnston ||  || Tokyo, Japan || TKO (Towel thrown)|| 4 || 1:52
|-
! style=background:white colspan=9 |
|-  bgcolor="#CCFFCC"
| 1981-12- || Win ||align=left| Keiichi Sei ||  || Tokyo, Japan || KO || 3 ||
|-  bgcolor="#CCFFCC"
| 1981-06- || Win ||align=left| Kou Saotome ||  || Tokyo, Japan || KO || 1 ||
|-  bgcolor="#fbb"
| 1981-05- || Loss||align=left| Keiji Saito ||  || Tokyo, Japan || TKO || 2 ||
|-  bgcolor="#CCFFCC"
| 1980-09-29 || Win ||align=left| Kripet Pratep ||  || || Decision || 5 || 3:00
|-  bgcolor="#CCFFCC"
| 1980-08-28 || Win ||align=left| Sinsak Sosripan ||  || || KO || 2 ||
|-  bgcolor="#CCFFCC"
| 1980-02-27 || Win ||align=left| Chan Chiarun ||  || || Decision || 5 || 3:00
|-  bgcolor="#fbb"
| 1980-01-28 || Loss||align=left| Santi Rekchai ||  || || Decision || 5 || 3:00
|-  bgcolor="#CCFFCC"
| 1980-01-03 || Win ||align=left| Kunimasa Nagae ||  || || KO || 2 ||

|-  bgcolor="#cfc"
| 1979-12-|| Win||align=left| Saksaron Saknarong ||  || Tokyo, Japan || Decision || 5 ||3:00

|-  bgcolor="#fbb"
| 1979-08-|| Loss||align=left| Weerachat Sordaeng||  || Tokyo, Japan || TKO || 2 ||

|-  bgcolor="#cfc"
| 1979-06-|| Win||align=left| Santi Rekchai ||  || Tokyo, Japan || Decision || 5 ||3:00

|-  bgcolor="#cfc"
| 1979-04-03 || Win||align=left| Khunponnoi Haphalang ||  || Tokyo, Japan || TKO (Punches) || 5 ||

|-  bgcolor="#fbb"
| 1979-02-12 || Loss ||align=left| Narongnoi Kiatbandit || Rajadamnern Stadium || Bangkok, Thailand || Decision || 5 ||3:00
|-
! style=background:white colspan=9 |

|-  bgcolor="#cfc"
| 1979-02-06 || Win||align=left| Prayuth Sittiboonlert ||  || Tokyo, Japan || Decision  || 5 || 3:00

|-  bgcolor="#CCFFCC"
| 1978-12-23|| Win ||align=left| Sinsak Sosripan ||  ||  || Decision || 5 ||3:00

|-  bgcolor="#CCFFCC"
| 1978-11-25|| Win ||align=left| Pirapon Chosaman ||  ||  || KO || 3 ||

|-  bgcolor="#CCFFCC"
| 1978-10-30 || Win ||align=left| Siprae Kiatsompop ||  || Tokyo, Japan || KO (Right Hook) || 7 ||
|-
! style=background:white colspan=9 |
|-

|-  bgcolor="#CCFFCC"
| 1978-10-10|| Win ||align=left| Pirapon Chosaman ||  ||  || KO || 2 ||

|-  style="background:#cfc;"
| 1978-09-15 || Win ||align=left| Pudpadnoi Worawut || Lumpinee Stadium || Bangkok, Thailand || Decision || 5 || 3:00

|-  bgcolor="#CCFFCC"
| 1978-08-26 || Win ||align=left| Pirapon Chosaman ||  || Tokyo, Japan || KO || 4 ||

|-  style="background:#cfc;"
| 1978-08-02 || Win ||align=left| Refugio Flores ||  || Tokyo, Japan || KO || 5 ||

|-  bgcolor="#fbb"
| 1978-06-07 || Loss ||align=left| Siprae Kiatsompop || Rajadamnern Stadium || Bangkok, Thailand || Decision (Unanimous) || 5 || 3:00
|-
! style=background:white colspan=9 |
|-
|-  bgcolor="#CCFFCC"
| 1978-05-27 || Win ||align=left| Wongchai Chorsawan ||  ||  || KO || 1 ||

|-  bgcolor="#CCFFCC"
| 1978-03-18 || Win ||align=left| Mongsawan Lukchangmai ||  || Tokyo, Japan || KO || 4 || 
|-
! style=background:white colspan=9 |
|-
|-  bgcolor="#CCFFCC"
| 1977-11- || Win ||align=left| Wannarong Piwamit ||  ||  ||Decision || 5 ||3:00  
|-  bgcolor="#CCFFCC"
| 1977-09- || Win ||align=left| Sorpongsak Sohoyo||  ||  ||KO || 2 ||

|-  bgcolor="#CCFFCC"
| 1977-07-24 || Win ||align=left| Chawarin Kiatchangklrai||  ||  ||KO || 2 ||

|-  bgcolor="#CCFFCC"
| 1977-04-07 || Win ||align=left| Chalermpon Sor Tha-It || Rajadamnern Stadium || Bangkok, Thailand ||Decision|| 5 || 3:00 
|-
! style=background:white colspan=9 |

|-  bgcolor="#CCFFCC"
| 1977-03-05 || Win ||align=left| Katsuyuki Suzuki || AJKA || Tokyo, Japan  || KO || 5 || 0:44
|-
! style=background:white colspan=9 |
|-
|-  bgcolor="#CCFFCC"
| 1976-12-4 || Win ||align=left| Tsuchai Iserapap ||  || || KO || 3 ||
|-  bgcolor="#CCFFCC"
| 1976-10-30 || Win ||align=left| Rawee Wiwerchai || Rajadamnern Stadium || Bangkok, Thailand || KO || 1 ||
|-  bgcolor="#CCFFCC"
| 1976-09- || Win ||align=left| Tsuchai Iserapap ||  || || KO || 1 ||
|-  bgcolor="#fbb"
| 1976-08-21 || Loss ||align=left| Rawee Wiwerchai || AJKA || Tokyo, Japan || TKO (Middle kicks) || 1 || 0:55
|-  bgcolor="#CCFFCC"
| 1976-07- || Win ||align=left| Gamonfa Sitesai ||  || || KO || 2 ||
|-  bgcolor="#CCFFCC"
| 1976-07-09 || Win ||align=left| Ryo Tsuchiya || AJKA || Tokyo, Japan  || TKO || 3 || 3:00
|-
! style=background:white colspan=9 |
|-
|-  bgcolor="#CCFFCC"
| 1976-06- || Win ||align=left| Chobu Rai ||  || || KO || 2 ||
|-  bgcolor="#CCFFCC"
| 1976-05- || Win ||align=left| Rung Sinyasonpon ||  || || KO || 3 ||
|-  bgcolor="#CCFFCC"
| 1976-05- || Win ||align=left| Gamonfa Sitesai ||  || || KO || 1 ||
|-  bgcolor="#CCFFCC"
| 1976-04- || Win ||align=left| Rantae Weerapon || AJKA || Tokyo, Japan|| TKO || 2 ||
|-  bgcolor="#fbb"
| 1976-03-08 || Loss ||align=left| Sirimongkol Luksiripat || Rajadamnern Stadium || Bangkok, Thailand || Decision || 5 || 3:00
|-  bgcolor="#CCFFCC"
| 1976-01-27 || Win ||align=left| Bakrynu Maropitak ||  || || KO || 4 ||
|-  bgcolor="#CCFFCC"
| 1976-01-1 || Win ||align=left| Rung Sinyasonpon ||  || || Decision || 5 || 3:00
|-  bgcolor="#CCFFCC"
| 1975-12- || Win ||align=left| Ri Sapoton ||  || || KO || 3 ||
|-  bgcolor="#CCFFCC"
| 1975-11- || Win ||align=left| Chachain Lukbangko||  || || KO || 2 ||
|-  bgcolor="#CCFFCC"
| 1975-10- || Win ||align=left| Pesito Simoosan ||  || || KO || 3 ||
|-  bgcolor="#CCFFCC"
| 1975-05-31 || Win ||align=left| Masanobu Sato || AJKA || Tokyo, Japan || Decision || 5 || 3:00
|-
! style=background:white colspan=9 |
|-
|-  bgcolor="#CCFFCC"
| 1975-05- || Win ||align=left| Chamoon Pontawee ||  || || KO || 3 ||
|-  bgcolor="#CCFFCC"
| 1975-04- || Win ||align=left| Banchin Sibaton ||  || || KO || 3 ||
|-  bgcolor="#CCFFCC"
| 1975-03-8 || Win ||align=left| Chamoon Pontawee ||  || Bangkok, Thailand || KO || 4 ||
|-  bgcolor="#fbb"
| 1974-11-26 || Loss ||align=left| Singtong Katwanyinpak ||  ||Tokyo, Japan || Decision || 5 || 3:00
|-
! style=background:white colspan=9 |
|-  bgcolor="#CCFFCC"
| 1974-10-29 || Win ||align=left| Jaidee Pisanurachan || Tokyo, Japan || ||Decision || 5 || 3:00
|-  bgcolor="#CCFFCC"
| 1974-09- || Win ||align=left| Asawin Charonchai ||  || || Decision || 5 || 3:00
|-  bgcolor="#CCFFCC"
| 1974-09- || Win ||align=left| Fason Sosampakon ||  || || KO || 3 ||
|-  bgcolor="#CCFFCC"
| 1974-08- || Win ||align=left| Taksin Chanarit ||  || || KO || 2 ||
|-  bgcolor="#CCFFCC"
| 1974-07- || Win ||align=left| Shozo Nakamura ||  || Tokyo, Japan || KO || 5 ||
|-  bgcolor="#c5d2ea"
| 1974-06- || Draw||align=left| Muangchon Jeeraphan || Rajadamnern Stadium || Bangkok, Thailand || Decision || 5 || 3:00
|-  bgcolor="#CCFFCC"
| 1974-05- || Win ||align=left| Saenchin Petchatanun ||  || Tokyo, Japan || KO || 3 ||
|-  bgcolor="#CCFFCC"
| 1974-04- || Win ||align=left| Radjo Isarapap ||  || || KO || 2 ||
|-  bgcolor="#CCFFCC"
| 1974-03- || Win ||align=left| Bangyai Isarapap ||  || || Decision || 5 || 3:00
|-  bgcolor="#CCFFCC"
| 1974-01- || Win ||align=left| Kyoshi Masuzawa ||  || || KO || 1 ||
|-  bgcolor="#CCFFCC"
| 1974-01- || Win ||align=left| Potoron Soponwat ||  || || Decision || 5 || 3:00
|-  bgcolor="#CCFFCC"
| 1973-12- || Win ||align=left| Goro Arashi || AJKA || Tokyo, Japan || Decision || 5 || 3:00
|-
! style=background:white colspan=9 |
|-
|-  bgcolor="#CCFFCC"
| 1973-11- || Win ||align=left| Sakuda Iserapa ||  || || KO || 4 ||
|-  bgcolor="#CCFFCC"
| 1973-11- || Win ||align=left| Asawin Sidowata ||  || || Decision || 5 || 3:00
|-  bgcolor="#fbb"
| 1973-10- || Loss ||align=left| Ronchai Wancharasak ||  || || TKO (referee stoppage) || 2 ||
|-  bgcolor="#CCFFCC"
| 1973-07- || Win ||align=left| Komchak Sida ||  || || Decision || 5 || 3:00
|-  bgcolor="#CCFFCC"
| 1973-06-6 || Win ||align=left| Masanori Sawano || AJKA || Tokyo, Japan  || Decision || 5 || 3:00
|-
! style=background:white colspan=9 |
|-
|-  bgcolor="#CCFFCC"
| 1973-06- || Win ||align=left| Richidet Sangmorakot ||  || || KO || 2 ||
|-  bgcolor="#CCFFCC"
| 1973-04- || Win ||align=left| Meksuran Iserapa ||  || || KO || 4 ||
|-  bgcolor="#CCFFCC"
| 1973-04- || Win ||align=left| Samsei Iserapa ||  || || KO || 1 ||
|-  bgcolor="#CCFFCC"
| 1973-03-29 || Win ||align=left| Shozo Saijo ||  || Tokyo, Japan
| TKO (corner stoppage) || 3 || 3:00
|-  bgcolor="#CCFFCC"
| 1973-03-1 || Win ||align=left| Monkran Shinsonton ||  || || Decision || 5 || 3:00
|-  bgcolor="#CCFFCC"
| 1973-02- || Win ||align=left| Shinji Tomaru ||  || || KO || 2 ||
|-  bgcolor="#CCFFCC"
| 1973-01-22 || Win ||align=left| Pripechee Rukprajanban ||  || || KO || 3 ||
|-  bgcolor="#CCFFCC"
| 1973-01-15 || Win ||align=left| Tarnin Saksery ||  || || KO || 4 ||
|-  bgcolor="#CCFFCC"
| 1973-01- || Win ||align=left| Senpet Tunaronglit ||  || || KO || 1 ||
|-  bgcolor="#c5d2ea"
| 1972-11-30 || Draw ||align=left| Minoru Shanzyo ||  || Tokyo, Japan || Decision || 5 || 3:00
|-  bgcolor="#CCFFCC"
| 1972-11-22 || Win ||align=left| Samande Itechai ||  || Bangkok, Thailand || KO || 3 ||
|-  bgcolor="#CCFFCC"
| 1972-10- || Win ||align=left| Bindio Apansak ||  || || KO ||  ||
|-  bgcolor="#CCFFCC"
| 1972-10- || Win ||align=left| Atisak Uik ||  || || KO ||  ||
|-  bgcolor="#fbb"
| 1972-08-12 || Loss ||align=left| Saenchai Srisompop ||  Kittikachorn Stadium || Bangkok, Thailand || TKO (Doctor stoppage/cut) || 4 ||
|-  bgcolor="#CCFFCC"
| 1972-07- || Win ||align=left| Srasak Wapuyak ||  || || KO ||  ||
|-  bgcolor="#CCFFCC"
| 1972-07- || Win ||align=left| Werasak Sodek ||  || || Decision || 5 || 3:00
|-  bgcolor="#CCFFCC"
| 1972-06-21 || Win ||align=left| Yoshimitsu Tamashiro || AJKA || Tokyo, Japan  || Decision || 5 || 3:00
|-
! style=background:white colspan=9 |
|-
|-  bgcolor="#CCFFCC"
| 1972-05-21 || Win ||align=left| Tanwa Novinyam ||  || || KO ||  ||
|-  bgcolor="#CCFFCC"
| 1972-04-30 || Win ||align=left| Rungnapa Sitsomsak || || Bangkok, Thailand
| DQ || 4 ||
|-  bgcolor="#CCFFCC"
| 1972-03- || Win ||align=left| Tosak Timrand ||  || || KO || 3 ||
|-  bgcolor="#CCFFCC"
| 1972-02- || Win ||align=left| Sitchai Amonrad ||  || || KO || 1 ||
|-  bgcolor="#CCFFCC"
| 1972-01- || Win ||align=left| Honton Swwonmisbwon ||  || || KO || 2 ||
|-  bgcolor="#CCFFCC"
| 1972-01- || Win ||align=left| Itenushi Marako ||  || || KO || 1 ||
|-  bgcolor="#CCFFCC"
| 1971-12-05 || Win ||align=left| Yoshimitsu Tamashiro ||  ||  || Decision || 5 || 3:00
|-
! style=background:white colspan=9 |
|-
|-  bgcolor="#CCFFCC"
| 1971-11- || Win ||align=left| Saksui Suihara ||  || || KO || 3 ||
|-  bgcolor="#CCFFCC"
| 1971-10- || Win ||align=left| Potep Repara ||  || || KO || 1 ||
|-  bgcolor="#CCFFCC"
| 1971-09- || Win ||align=left| Krasuk Rukhayer ||  || || KO || 3 ||
|-  bgcolor="#CCFFCC"
| 1971-08- || Win ||align=left| Isorayuk Chaimrand ||  || || KO || 4 ||
|-  bgcolor="#CCFFCC"
| 1971-08- || Win ||align=left| Yorkursuk Sakchari ||  || || KO || 3 ||
|-  bgcolor="#CCFFCC"
| 1971-07- || Win ||align=left| Shina Takashi ||  || || KO || 1 ||
|-  bgcolor="#CCFFCC"
| 1971-06- || Win ||align=left| Buton Sikmu ||  || || KO || 2 ||
|-  bgcolor="#CCFFCC"
| 1971-05- || Win ||align=left| Fadem Rukbamkra ||  || || KO || 4 ||
|-  bgcolor="#CCFFCC"
| 1971-05- || Win ||align=left| Buton Sikmu ||  || || KO || 5 ||
|-  bgcolor="#fbb"
| 1971-04- || Loss ||align=left| Srasak Wayupak ||  || || TKO (referee stoppage) || 2 ||
|-  bgcolor="#CCFFCC"
| 1971-04- || Win ||align=left| Viradarek Rukranton ||  || || KO || 3 ||
|-  bgcolor="#CCFFCC"
| 1971-03- || Win ||align=left| Pichron Rudson ||  || || KO || 2 ||
|-  bgcolor="#CCFFCC"
| 1971-03- || Win ||align=left| Sirisak Rukgansiri ||  || || KO || 4 ||
|-  bgcolor="#CCFFCC"
| 1971-02- || Win ||align=left| Pripan Beosryan ||  || || KO || 2 ||
|-  bgcolor="#CCFFCC"
| 1971-02- || Win ||align=left| Pirapon Lumeini ||  || || KO || 1 ||
|-  bgcolor="#CCFFCC"
| 1971-01- || Win ||align=left| Viradack Lukrontan ||  || || KO || 2 ||
|-  bgcolor="#CCFFCC"
| 1970-12-25 || Win ||align=left| Sonkran Lukpanchaman ||  || || Decision || 5 || 3:00
|-  bgcolor="#CCFFCC"
| 1970-11-28 || Win ||align=left| Pichan Sicharo ||  || || KO || 1 ||
|-  bgcolor="#CCFFCC"
| 1970-11-11 || Win ||align=left| Kwanjaluk Satahip ||  || || KO || 2 ||
|-  bgcolor="#CCFFCC"
| 1970-10-31 || Win ||align=left| Kazuo Nimoto ||  || || KO || 3 ||
|-  bgcolor="#CCFFCC"
| 1970-10-17 || Win ||align=left| Tchaomang Sopiboon||  || || KO || 1 ||
|-  bgcolor="#CCFFCC"
| 1970-09-26 || Win ||align=left| Goming Sicharo||  || || KO || 2 ||
|-  bgcolor="#CCFFCC"
| 1970-09-05 || Win ||align=left| Tachasing Sicharo||  || || KO || 4 ||
|-  bgcolor="#CCFFCC"
| 1970-08-17 || Win ||align=left| Mitsuo Nakano ||  || || KO || 3 ||
|-  bgcolor="#CCFFCC"
| 1970-08-07 || Win ||align=left| Tyali Saktyali ||  || || KO || 2 ||
|-  bgcolor="#CCFFCC"
| 1970-07-27 || Win ||align=left| Yasesak Srimon ||  || || Decision || 5 || 3:00
|-  bgcolor="#CCFFCC"
| 1970-07-10 || Win ||align=left| Sorasak Jeuaron ||  || || KO|| 1 ||
|-  bgcolor="#CCFFCC"
| 1970-06-22 || Win ||align=left| Krachai Honsurai ||  || || KO|| 2 ||
|-  bgcolor="#CCFFCC"
| 1970-05-30 || Win ||align=left| Muanyak Kachapichit ||  || || KO|| 2 ||
|-  bgcolor="#CCFFCC"
| 1970-05-09 || Win ||align=left| Bandal Ruskrepat ||  || || KO|| 2 ||
|-  bgcolor="#CCFFCC"
| 1970-04-13 || Win ||align=left| Tcharomchai Kartesuk ||  || || KO|| 1 ||
|-  bgcolor="#CCFFCC"
| 1970-04-04 || Win ||align=left| Chainor Jadoparson ||  || || KO|| 2 ||
|-  bgcolor="#CCFFCC"
| 1970-03-20 || Win ||align=left| Mitsuo Nakano ||  || Japan  || Decision || 5 || 3:00
|-  bgcolor="#CCFFCC"
| 1970-02-27 || Win ||align=left| Surin Udomsak ||  ||  || KO || 4 ||
|-  bgcolor="#CCFFCC"
| 1970-02-07 || Win ||align=left| Honkaew Suranmisakawan||  ||  || Decision || 5 || 3:00
|-  bgcolor="#CCFFCC"
| 1970-01-21 || Win ||align=left| Chainor Jadoparson ||  || Japan || KO|| 4 ||
|-  bgcolor="#CCFFCC"
| 1970-01-06 || Win ||align=left| Phoenix Yamaguchi ||  || Japan || Decision || 5 || 3:00
|-  bgcolor="#CCFFCC"
| 1969-12-19 || Win ||align=left| Eiji Sakamoto ||  || Japan || Decision || 5 || 3:00
|-  bgcolor="#fbb"
| 1969-11- || Loss||align=left| Sakuchai Rakanton ||  ||  || Decision || 5 || 3:00
|-  bgcolor="#fbb"
| 1969-10- || Loss||align=left| Nampon Kartesuk ||  ||  || Decision || 5 || 3:00
|-  bgcolor="#CCFFCC"
| 1969-10-01 || Win ||align=left| Takao Sakai ||  || Japan || KO || 2 || 
|-
| colspan=9 | Legend:

See also
List of male kickboxers

References

External links 
 TOSHIO FUJIWARA SPORTS GYM 

1948 births
Living people
Japanese male kickboxers
Lightweight kickboxers
Mixed martial arts referees
People from Iwate Prefecture